Heys International Ltd. is a  Canadian multinational manufacturer and distributor of travel products. The company makes luggage, business cases, backpacks and travel accessories. Heys International Ltd. is privately owned company. It was founded in 1986 in the suburbs of Toronto, Canada as a family business.  The company is known for its fashionable and lightweight luggage made from a polycarbonate composite. A few years before baggage fees were introduced, Heys created the xCase, a lightweight carry-on.  Heys International is known for its multimedia advertising across Canada.

Milestones 
In 2003, Heys introduced the xCase, which claimed to be the world's lightest hard side carry-on luggage at the time.

In 2008, Heys introduced the xScale, a small portable luggage scale.  This allows travelers to weigh their luggage on the go.

In 2008, Heys' first eco-friendly luggage, the EcoCase, was introduced. The EcoCase is made from 100% post-industrial recycled plastic. This was an environmental initiative launched by Heys which led to the development of eco-friendly travel accessories made with Ecotex.

Also in 2008, Heys established a partnership with Disney and introduced kids' backpacks, luggage & travel accessories.

In 2009, Heys relocated its head office to a new facility in Mississauga, Ontario, Canada.

In 2011, Heys became the official luggage for Porter Airlines.

References

External links 
 

Manufacturing companies of Canada